Großer Pönitzer See is a lake in Scharbeutz, Holsteinische Schweiz, Schleswig-Holstein, Germany.

Lakes of Schleswig-Holstein
LGrosserPonitzerSee